A riddle is a form of word puzzle.

Riddle may also refer to:

People
Riddle (surname), including a list of people with the name
Riki LeCotey, a Canadian cosplayer who uses the pseudonym "Riddle"
Matt Riddle (b. 1986), American professional wrestler performing under the ring name Riddle
Riddles (surname)

Places in the United States
Riddle, Idaho, an unincorporated community
Riddle, Indiana, an unincorporated community
Riddle, Oregon, a city in Douglas County
Riddle, West Virginia, an unincorporated community
Riddle Run, a tributary of the Allegheny River in Pennsylvania

Film and TV
Riddler (The Batman)
Riddle (film), a 2013 movie starring Val Kilmer
"Riddles" (Star Trek: Voyager), a 1999 episode of Star Trek: Voyager

Music
Riddle (album), a 1999 album by Thomas Leeb, and the title song
The Riddle (album), a 1984 album by Nik Kershaw, and the title song
"Riddle" (song), a single by En Vogue from the 2000 album Masterpiece Theatre
"The Riddle" (song), a single by Five for Fighting from the 2006 album Two Lights

Other
Riddle (tool), a large sieve used to separate finer from coarser particles of soil or compost
Riddle Airlines, an American airline founded in 1945
The Riddle Song, also known as "I Gave My Love a Cherry," an English folk song
World riddle, of Friedrich Nietzsche, the meaning of life

See also
Riddle of the Sphinx (disambiguation)
Riddling, a process in the production of sparkling wine